The 2017 LNFA season was the 23rd season of American football in Spain.

Teams were divided into three categories, named Serie A, B and C, with promotion and relegation between them.

Badalona Dracs won their eighth title, a record for the tournament.

LNFA Serie A

Tiebreakers
If two or more teams are tied at the end of the competition, the ranking of teams in each group is based on the following criteria:
 Highest percentage of wins in games between tied teams.
 Lowest percentage of points against in games between tied teams.
 Highest difference between points scored and points against in games between tied teams.
 Lowest percentage of points against in all the games.
 Highest difference between points scored and points against in all the games.
 Lowest percentage of sent off players in all the games.
 Drawing of lots.

Stadia and locations

Six teams entered the LNFA Serie A, the top-tier level of American football in Spain. Murcia Cobras promoted from the last Serie B while no team was relegated from the previous season.

As an expansion of the league to eight teams was planned, the last qualified team played also the relegation play-offs instead of being directly relegated.

Regular season

Playoffs

Relegation playoffs

|}

LNFA Serie B

Stadia and locations

Eight teams will play the Serie B in 2017. No teams were relegated from Serie A, while Las Rozas Black Demons, Rivas Osos and ANV Fuenlabrada Cuervos promoted from the previous season of the Serie C.

Granada Lions resigned to continue playing in the Serie B.

League table

Promotion playoffs
As the Serie A would be expanded to eight teams for the next season, the two winners of the semifinals both were directly promoted while the two losers would play a serie against the fifth and the sixth qualified teams of the Serie A.

LNFA Serie C

Andalusian League

Playoffs

Catalan league

Regular season

Playoffs

Madrilenian league

Northern league

Serie C League

Playoffs

Bracket

Source:

References

External links
Spanish American Football Federation
Fieldgoal.eu

Liga Nacional de Fútbol Americano
2016 in Spanish sport
2017 in Spanish sport
2017 in American football